Bekkem is a village in Chinnambaavi mandal in Wanaparthy district of Telangana.

Bekkem is a combination of 3 villages: Nelabilk, Peddhabilk and Gudem. Total population is 4005.
Bekkem's Pin code is 509104 and the postal head office is Pebbair .

Villages in Mahbubnagar district